York Rugby Union Football Club is an English Rugby Union team based in York. It has four senior men's teams and a women's team, along with a colts squad and eleven junior teams. The first XV currently plays in the North Premier division.

Ground
York's ground is Clifton Park which is run by the joint body of York Sports Club which is between York RUFC, York Cricket Club, York Tennis Club and York Squash Club. It has four full sized rugby pitches, two full sized cricket pitches and squash and tennis courts

Honours
Yorkshire Shield Winners x 4
North East 2 champions: 1988–89
North East 1 champions: 1991–92
North 2 champions: 1993–94
Yorkshire 1 champions: 2017–18
North 1 East champions: 2019–20

References

English rugby union teams
1928 establishments in England
Rugby clubs established in 1928
Sport in York